Toobin' is an Atari Games and Midway Games video game originally released as an arcade game in 1988 and is based on the recreational sport tubing. It was later ported to systems such as NES, Amiga, Commodore 64, MSX, and Game Boy Color. In the game, the player assumes control of the main characters Bif or Jet, guiding them through many winding rivers on an innertube.

Gameplay 

The player competes in a river race against the computer or another player. The player's score increases by swishing the gates, hitting other characters with cans, collecting hidden letters to spell Toobin', and collecting treasures. Players try to avoid obstacles while pushing each other into them.

Power-ups allow players to carry multiple cans and combinations of gates increase a score multiplier. The game has three different classes, each with five rivers, for a total of 15.

Legacy 
The game is included as part of Midway Arcade Treasures and Arcade Party Pak, where it was given a remixed soundtrack. It was also included in the 2012 compilation Midway Arcade Origins. The game is one of the 23 arcade games that are included with the Midway Arcade Level Pack for Lego Dimensions, unlocked by using the hidden Arcade Dock in the level "Follow The Lego Brick Road".  It is also an included title on the Midway Legacy Edition Arcade1Up cabinet.

References

External links

Toobin' at the Arcade History database

1988 video games
Arcade video games
Atari arcade games
Amiga games
Amstrad CPC games
Atari ST games
Commodore 64 games
Domark games
DOS games
Game Boy Color games
Midway video games 
MSX games
Nintendo Entertainment System games
Tengen (company) games
Teque London games
Unauthorized video games
Vertically-oriented video games
Video games developed in the United States
Video games scored by Allister Brimble
Video games scored by Brad Fuller
Video games scored by David Whittaker
Video games scored by Matt Furniss
Video games set in Canada
Video games set in Colorado
Video games set in Egypt
Video games set in Georgia (U.S. state)
Video games set in Germany
Video games set in Mexico
Video games set in South America
Video games set on Mars
ZX Spectrum games